Rubén Fernández Andújar (born 1 March 1991) is a Spanish cyclist, who currently rides for UCI WorldTeam .

Career
Fernández was born in Murcia. In August 2014  announced the signing of the 2013 Tour de l'Avenir champion Fernández on an initial 2-year contract. Fernández remained with the team until the end of the 2019 season, when he joined the  team.

Major results

2012
 1st Circuito Guadiana
2013
 1st  Overall Tour de l'Avenir
1st Stage 4
2014
 6th Overall Volta ao Algarve
 6th Vuelta a Murcia
 10th Overall Tour du Limousin
2015
 5th Overall Tour Down Under
 6th Overall Tour of Britain
 9th Overall Volta ao Algarve
 9th Overall Vuelta a Burgos
2016
 6th Overall Tour Down Under
 6th Overall Tour de Pologne
 6th Overall Vuelta a Burgos
 Vuelta a España
Held  after Stage 3
Held  after Stage 3
2017
 7th GP Miguel Induráin
2018
 5th Overall Vuelta a Asturias
 7th Overall Tour of Guangxi
2020
 5th Road race, National Road Championships
 7th Pollença–Andratx
 8th Overall Volta a la Comunitat Valenciana
 8th Trofeo Serra de Tramuntana
 9th Overall Vuelta a Andalucía
2021
 9th Overall UAE Tour
2022
 4th Overall O Gran Camiño
 7th Giro dell'Emilia
 8th Overall Tour de Langkawi
2023
 10th Overall O Gran Camiño

Grand Tour general classification results timeline

References

External links

1991 births
Living people
Spanish male cyclists
Cyclists from the Region of Murcia